Andrés Pajares Martín (Madrid 6 April 1940) is a Spanish actor, director, writer and comedian, in theater, film and television.

He started as a comedian in 1968, and during his early career he mixed regular shows with theater performances both as a comedian and as an actor. Although he also entered the world of films as an extra in the late 1960s, it was not until the end of the 1970s when he reached popularity.

He is known as an actor for movies like ¡Ay Carmela!, for which he received a Goya Award for Best Actor in 1991, and his eleven movies with Fernando Esteso directed by Mariano Ozores and produced between 1979 and 1984. With more than forty films in his career, he has also directed three movies, two of them also written by him, and wrote the script for another movie. In television, he is also known for the series ¡Ay, Señor, Señor! which were broadcast during 1994 and 1995.

During all his time he continued creating humoristic shows for television and theaters, and has received numerous awards for his accomplishments in the entertainment industry.

Selected filmography
 Bwana (1996)
 A Decent Adultery (1969)
 The Sailor with Golden Fists (1968)

Awards
 Won Goya Award for Best Actor 1991: ¡Ay Carmela!

External links 
 
 

1940 births
Living people
Male actors from Madrid
Spanish male television actors
Spanish male film actors
Best Actor Goya Award winners